The following is a list of professional and amateur theatres and theatre companies, temporary open-air theatres and stages in Hungary. They are organised in categories.

Classical theatres

Budapest

Rest of the country 
City theatres with permanent company
 Bartók Chamber Theatre and House of Arts of Dunaújváros, Dunaújváros
 Csiky Gergely Theatre of Kaposvár, Kaposvár
 Csokonai Theatre, Debrecen
 Gárdonyi Géza Theatre of Eger, Eger
 German Theatre, Szekszárd
 Hevesi Sándor Theatre of Zalaegerszeg, Zalaegerszeg
 Jászai Mari Theatre of Tatabánya, Tatabánya
 Jókai Theatre of Békéscsaba, Békéscsaba
 Katona József Theatre, Kecskemét
 Móricz Zsigmond Theatre, Nyíregyháza
 National Theatre of Győr, Győr
 National Theatre of Miskolc, Miskolc
 National Theatre of Pécs, Pécs
 National Theatre of Szeged, Szeged
 Petőfi Theatre of Veszprém, Veszprém
 Soproni Petőfi Theatre, Sopron
 Stage of Budaörs, Budaörs
 Szigligeti Theatre, Szolnok
 Third Theatre of Pécs, Pécs
 Vörösmarty Theatre, Székesfehérvár
 Weöres Sándor Theatre, Szombathely

Theatre buildings without permanent company, auditoriums, open-air and summer theatres
 Akropolisz Open-Air Theatre, Miskolctapolca
 Balaton Convention Center and Theatre, Keszthely
 Cave Theatre of Fertőrákos, Fertőrákos
 Court Theatre of Esztergom, Esztergom
 Court Theatre of Gyula, Gyula
 Court Theatre of Kisvárda
 Court Theatre of Kőszeg, Kőszeg
 Hagymaház, Makó
 Karnevál Theatre, Szombathely
 Open-air Theatre of Siófok, Siófok
 Open-air Theatre of Szeged, Szeged
 Pannon Court Theatre, Veszprém
 Summer Court Theatre of Siklós, Siklós
 Summer Theatre of Zala, Zalaegerszeg
 Summer Theatre of Zsámbék, Zsámbék
 Theatrum of Szentendre, Szentendre

Alternative theatres

Budapest 
 high acidic gasflux
 7 Főszín Company
 Andaxínház
 Aranyszamár Theatre
 Art Plaza
 Arvisura Theatrei Company
 Atlantis Theatre
 Atlasz Gábor Company
 Babszem Jankó GyermekTheatre
 Bácskai Júlia Psycho Theatre
 Baltazár Theatre
 Bálványos Company
 DNS Társulás
 Eleuszisz Theatre
 Gózon Gyula Chamber Theatre
 Hattyú Dal Theatre
 Híd Theatre
 Holdvilág Chamber Theatre
 Homo Ludens Musical Stage, Szombathely
 Hólyagcirkusz
 Junion Theatre
 Kas Theatre
 Kincses Theatre
 Kompánia Theatre Company
 Kókai János Company
 Körmendi Alternatív Theatre Company of Körmend
 Kuckó Művésztanya
 Levendula Theatre
 Maladype Theatre
 Maskarás Céh
 Mándy Ildikó Company
 Merlin Theatre
 Mozgó Ház
 Mu Theatre
 Nevesincs Theatre
 Paál István Studio Theatre
 Pasztell Theatre
 Pintér Béla Company
 Pont Műhely
 R.S.9. Studio Theatre
 Street Theatre of Budapest
 Stúdió K
 Szárnyak Theatrea
 Szív Chamber Theatre
 Szkéné Theatre
 TÁP Theatre
 Theatre of Fogi
 Theatrical Workshop of Szentkirály
 Trambulin Theatre
 Turay Ida Theatre
 Vakrepülés Company
 Várszegi Tibor Company
 Zug Theatre

Rest of the country 
 Berzsenyi Szinpad, Szombathely
 Civitas PinceTheatre, Sopron
 Croat Theatre of Pécs, Pécs
 Éjfél Theatre, Gödöllő
 Ferrum Társulás, Szombathely
 Homo Ludens Project, Szeged
 Janus University Theatre, Pécs
 KAS Theatre, Sopron
 KonzervArtaudrium Theatrei Műhely, Debrecen
 Prospero Company, Székesfehérvár
 Soltis Lajos Theatre, Celldömölk
 Teatro Capriccio Tent Theatre, Vigántpetend
 Tintaló Company, Kecskemét
 Weöres Sándor Regional Theatre, Szarvas
 Youth Actor Company of Pécs, Pécs

Movement and dance theatres 
 Balett of Győr (National Theatre of Győr)
 Balett of Pécs (National Theatre of Pécs)
 Bozsik Yvette Company
 Budapest Balett
 Budapest Dance Theatre
 Dance Theatre of Dunaújváros
 Duna Art Company
 Experidance
 Ékszer Balett Dance Company
 Frenák Pál Company
 Goda Gábor Company
 Honvéd Dance Theatre
 Middle-Europe Dance Theatre
 L1 táncMűvek
 Hungarian Festival Balett
 Hungarian National Balett (Magyar Állami Operaház)
 Hungarian National Folk Ensemble
 Még 1 Mozdulatszínház
 National Dance Theatre
 Sámán Theatre
 Somi Panni és a Sivasakti Kalánanda Dance Theatre
 Szeged Contemporary Dance Company (National Theatre of Szeged)
 TranzDanz
 Vision Dance Theater

Puppet theatres 
 Budapest Puppet Theatre
 Bóbita Puppet Theatre, Pécs
 Ciróka Puppet Theatre, Kecskemét
 Csodamalom Puppet Theatre, Miskolc
 Fabula Puppet Theatre
 Harlekin Puppet Theatre
 Kincses Theatre
 Kövér Béla Puppet Theatre, Szeged
 Maskara Company
 Mesebolt Puppet Theatre
 Mikropódium Családi Puppet Theatre
 Nefelejcs Puppet Theatre
 Nevesincs Színház
 Óperenciás Puppet Theatre
 Vaskakas Puppet Theatre, Győr
 Vojtina Puppet Theatre, Debrecen

Hungary
Theatres